El Andévalo or El Campo de Andévalo is a comarca in Huelva Province, Andalusia, southern Spain. It is located between the Sierra de Huelva, Costa Occidental, Cuenca Minera, Huelva and Condado de Huelva comarcas and the border of Portugal.

The present-day comarca was established in 2003.

Municipal terms
Alosno
Tharsis, Huelva
Cabezas Rubias
Calañas
El Almendro
El Cerro de Andévalo
El Granado
La Zarza-Perrunal
Paymogo
Puebla de Guzmán
San Bartolomé de la Torre
Sanlúcar de Guadiana
Santa Bárbara de Casa
Valverde del Camino
Villanueva de las Cruces 
Villanueva de los Castillejos

See also
Comarcas of Andalusia

References

External links

Andevalo

Comarcas of Andalusia
Geography of the Province of Huelva